

Controllers
Each company who has released a console has also released a controller for that particular console. The Wii console is capable of using a controller from both the Wii and the GameCube.

Light guns

The 3DO Company
Game Gun- 3DO Interactive Multiplayer

Atari
XG-1-Atari 2600, Atari 8-bit family

Other
Intellivision
CD-i

Nintendo
NES Zapper-Nintendo Entertainment System
Super Scope-Super Nintendo
 The Wii Zapper

Sega
Dreamcast light guns-Dreamcast
Menacer-Sega Genesis, Sega CD
Light Phaser-Sega Master System

Music and rhythm peripherals

Nintendo Entertainment System
Miracle Piano Teaching System keyboard

GameCube
Donkey Konga bongo controllers
Dance Dance Revolution controllers

Dreamcast
Samba de Amigo maracas controller set
Dance Dance Revolution controller

PlayStation
Dance Dance Revolution controllers by Konami and third parties
BeatMania controller by Konami

PlayStation 2
Dance Dance Revolution controllers by Konami and third parties
Guitar Hero Gibson SG controllers - PlayStation 2
ParaPara Paradise controller by Konami
BeatMania controllers by Konami
DrumMania controller by Konami and third parties
GuitarFreaks controller by Konami
Pop n' Music controller

Xbox
Dance Dance Revolution controllers by Konami and third parties

Miscellaneous peripherals

NES
R.O.B. - Famicom version known simply as Robot, NES version named R.O.B., short for Robotic Operating Buddy

SNES
Voice-Kun - A Super Famicom device packaged with the Koei games Angelique Voice Fantasy and EMIT Vol.1 to 3.

GameCube
Microphone - A microphone meant for use in such games as Mario Party 6.

Casio Loopy
Magical Shop - A device which allows the user to take images from outside video sources, such as DVDs, VHS tapes, or camcorders, add text, and make them into stickers

Nintendo DS

Wii

 The Nunchuk - An attachment for the Wii Remote. It is plugged into the Wii Remote's expansion port, where the two are connected via a cord.

 The Classic Controller – a special controller attachment for the Wii Remote. While it is compatible with any Virtual Console game, it is heavily designed after the SNES controller and Sega Genesis controller. Many Wii games can also be played with the Classic Controller.

 The Wii Sensor Bar – A bar that you point the Wii remote at to get the cursor on the television to work the Wii. The sensor bar is optional, as you can use the Classic Controller or the Classic Controller Pro. The bar comes with every console.

 The Wii Wheel – is an accessory that came packaged with every copy of Mario Kart Wii, though can also be purchased separately. It is also compatible with some driving games, such as Excitebots: Trick Racing and Sonic & Sega All-Stars Racing.

 Wii Speak – is an accessory for the Wii console that allows the player to talk with others around the world without the need for a headset. The device can be placed near a television and anyone in the room will be able to talk. If you have this accessory, you are also able to download the Wii Speak Channel.

 The Wii Vitality Sensor – A cancelled accessory for the Wii. Announced by Satoru Iwata at E3 in 2009, not much is known about the Vitality Sensor and how it would have been integrated into video games. It has been suggested by Iwata that it would be used to relax the player, telling them their heartbeat and about their body.

Fishing rod peripherals
Dreamcast
Nintendo labo toy-con 01

Mouse peripherals
Mega Drive
SNES
Casio Loopy
Dreamcast

See also 
 List of Nintendo Entertainment System accessories
 List of Super Nintendo Entertainment System accessories

Accessories